Eicher Motors Limited is an Indian multinational automotive company that manufactures motorcycles and commercial vehicles, headquartered in New Delhi. Eicher is the parent company of Royal Enfield, a manufacturer of middleweight motorcycles.

History

Eicher Motors is a commercial vehicle manufacturer in India.  The company's origins date back to 1948, when Goodearth Company was established for the distribution and service of imported tractors.  In 1959 the Eicher Tractor Corporation of India Private Ltd was established, jointly with the Eicher tractor company, a German tractor manufacturer. Since 1965, Eicher in India has been completely owned by Indian shareholders. The German Eicher tractor was partly owned by Massey Ferguson from 1970, when they bought 30%. Massey Ferguson bought out the German company in 1973.

In 2005, Eicher Motors Ltd sold their tractors and engines business to TAFE Tractors (Tractors and Farm Equipment Ltd) of Chennai, the Indian licensee of Massey Ferguson tractors.

In October 1982, a collaboration agreement with Mitsubishi for the manufacture of light commercial vehicles (LCVs) was signed in Tokyo and in the same period the incorporation of Eicher Motors Limited also took place. LCVs were sold under the "Eicher Mitsubishi" brand. In February 1990, Eicher Goodearth bought 26% stake in Enfield India Ltd and by 1993 Eicher acquired a majority stake (60% equity shareholding) in Royal Enfield India.

In July 2008, Eicher Motors Limited (EML) and Volvo Group's formed a 50:50 joint venture called VE Commercial Vehicles (VECV) which designs, manufactures and markets commercial vehicles, engineering components and provides engineering design.

At present, Volvo Group owns 45.6% of VECV, while Eicher Motors holds the remaining 54.4%. In 2020, VECV bought Volvo Buses India operations for ₹100 crore.

In 2012, Eicher Motors started a joint venture with American company Polaris Industries called Eicher Polaris to make personal utility vehicles, starting with Eicher Polaris Multix in 2015. This joint venture company ceased operations in 2018.

Group structure

The Eicher Group has diversified business interests in design and development, manufacturing, and local and international marketing of trucks, buses, motorcycles, automotive gears, and components. Eicher has invested in the potential growth areas of management consultancy services, customised engineering, and maps and travel guides.

VE Commercial Vehicles (VECV) Limited is a joint venture between Volvo Group and Eicher Motors Limited. VECV is divided into five business units:

 Eicher Trucks and Buses
 Volvo Trucks India
 Eicher Engineering Components
 VE Powertrain

Royal Enfield Motors, the motorcycle manufacturing subsidiary, is a part of Eicher Motors.

Vehicles
Eicher DragonHook
Eicher Sleek

References

External links

 

Companies based in New Delhi
Motor vehicle engine manufacturers
Truck manufacturers of India
Vehicle manufacturing companies established in 1948
Indian companies established in 1948
Indian brands
Engine manufacturers of India
Motorcycle manufacturers of India
NIFTY 50
 
Companies listed on the National Stock Exchange of India
Companies listed on the Bombay Stock Exchange